Isku (Quechua for lime, hispanicized spelling Iscu) is a mountain in the Andes of Peru, about  high. It is located in the Lima Region, Oyón Province, Oyón District. Isku lies southeast of Yana Uqhu.

References

Mountains of Peru
Mountains of Lima Region